The 2012–13 season will be Egri FC's 6th competitive season, 1st consecutive season in the OTP Bank Liga and 104th year in existence as a football club.

First team squad

Transfers

Summer

In:

Out:

Winter

In:

Out:

List of Hungarian football transfers summer 2012
List of Hungarian football transfers winter 2012–13

Statistics

Appearances and goals
Last updated on 2 June 2013.

|-
|colspan="14"|Youth players:
|-

|-
|colspan="14"|Players currently out on loan:

|-
|colspan="14"|Players no longer at the club:

|}

Top scorers
Includes all competitive matches. The list is sorted by shirt number when total goals are equal.

Last updated on 2 June 2013

Disciplinary record
Includes all competitive matches. Players with 1 card or more included only.

Last updated on 2 June 2013

Overall
{|class="wikitable"
|-
|Games played || 41 (30 OTP Bank Liga, 1 Hungarian Cup and 10 Hungarian League Cup)
|-
|Games won || 8 (3 OTP Bank Liga, 0 Hungarian Cup and 5 Hungarian League Cup)
|-
|Games drawn || 7 (6 OTP Bank Liga, 0 Hungarian Cup and 1 Hungarian League Cup)
|-
|Games lost || 26 (21 OTP Bank Liga, 1 Hungarian Cup and 4 Hungarian League Cup)
|-
|Goals scored || 46
|-
|Goals conceded || 85
|-
|Goal difference || -39
|-
|Yellow cards || 90
|-
|Red cards || 5
|-
|rowspan="2"|Worst discipline ||  Čedomir Pavičević (9 , 0 )
|-
|  Csaba Preklet (9 , 0 )
|-
|rowspan="1"|Best result || 4–0 (H) v Újpest FC - Ligakupa - 13-11-2012
|-
|rowspan="1"|Worst result || 1–6 (A) v Lombard-Pápa TFC - OTP Bank Liga - 11-05-2013
|-
|rowspan="1"|Most appearances ||  Norbert Németh (36 appearances)
|-
|rowspan="1"|Top scorer ||  Norbert Németh (13 goals)
|-
|Points || 31/123 (25.2%)
|-

Nemzeti Bajnokság I

Matches

Classification

Results summary

Results by round

Hungarian Cup

League Cup

Group stage

Classification

Knockout phase

References

External links
 Eufo
 Official Website

Hungarian football clubs 2012–13 season